A Daughter of the Wolf is a 1919 American silent drama film directed by Irvin Willat and written by Marion Fairfax and Hugh Pendexter. The film stars Lila Lee, Elliott Dexter, Clarence Geldart, Raymond Hatton, Richard Wayne, and Minnie Devereaux. The film was released on June 22, 1919, by Paramount Pictures.

Plot

Cast
Lila Lee as Annette Ainsworth
Elliott Dexter as Robert Draly
Clarence Geldart as "Wolf" Ainsworth
Raymond Hatton as Doc
Richard Wayne as Sgt. Tim Roper
Minnie Devereaux as Mrs. Beavertail
James "Jim" Mason as Roe 
Jack Herbert as Jacques
Marcia Manon as Jean Burroughs
James Neill as Judge Burroughs
Clyde Benson as M. Pomgret
Roy Diem as Clerk
Charles Ogle as Doc

References

External links

1919 films
1910s English-language films
Silent American drama films
1919 drama films
Paramount Pictures films
Films directed by Irvin Willat
American black-and-white films
American silent feature films
1910s American films